We Want Our Mummy is a 1939 short subject directed by Del Lord starring American slapstick comedy team The Three Stooges (Moe Howard, Larry Fine and Curly Howard). It is the 37th entry in the series released by Columbia Pictures starring the comedians, who released 190 shorts for the studio between 1934 and 1959.

Plot
Museum curators Dr. Powell (Bud Jamison) and Professor Wilson (James C. Morton) hire the Stooges as private detectives to locate Professor Tuttle of Egyptology, who went missing while attempting to find the mummy of Egyptian King Rootentooten in Cairo. The Stooges check the basement and help a man take a box onto a truck, not aware that Tuttle is bound and gagged inside. They are then told by the curators to find the tomb and bring back the mummy, for which they will be paid $5,000. They hail a taxicab in New York City, and inform the bewildered driver they are bound for Egypt.

Once in Egypt, the boys, under the duress of a mirage, believe an empty patch of sand is a lake of cool water, and dive in, inadvertently diving into a series of tunnels that may lead to the tomb of Rootentooten. They begin to investigate, but end up separated, as Curly runs afoul with a living mummy. He takes off running, and he and his pals reunite.

Upon reuniting, the Stooges learn that Tuttle is being held hostage by a group of thieves; they have him bound and gagged as the Stooges wander through the tunnels. Curly finds what the Stooges believe to be the mummy of Rootin' Tootin' in a secret room, activated by a trap door. When Curly tries to pick it up (the mummy, that is), he clumsily drops it, crumbling it to dust.

They then hear the evil gang boss Jackson (Dick Curtis) threatening the professor in the hopes of getting him to tell the crooks where the mummy is. The frightened professor tells them, and is warned that if the mummy is not there, he and the Stooges will be killed. The Stooges realize they will be killed if Jackson discovers the crushed mummy, so Moe gets the idea to make a mummy out of Curly. Curly responds by stating, "I can't be a mummy, I'm a daddy!", but he relents when warned of the alternative. He lies on the stone slab in disguise when the crooks arrive. Jackson decides to search for the jewels by cutting Curly open, causing Curly to open the bandages on his chest when Jackson turns his head away. Jackson then searches in Curly's jacket, pulls a newspaper out and reads "'Yanks win World Series' — can you beat that!" Curly blows his cover by replying, "Yeah, and I won five bucks!" Realizing he has been tricked, Jackson charges Curly, but in the process of chasing the Stooges, he and his cronies fall into a well Curly had fallen into earlier and hid using a carpet. The Stooges admit to Professor Tuttle that Curly had destroyed the mummy; it turns out, however, that the mummy which was destroyed was not that of Rootentooten, but of his wife, Queen Hotsy-Totsy. He holds up a small mummy case, containing the real mummy of Rootentooten, who was a midget. Professor Tuttle and the Stooges are frightened away by a Nile crocodile (inaccurately referred as an "alligator" in this short).

Production notes
We Want Our Mummy was filmed on November 1–4, 1938. It is the first Stooge film to employ "Three Blind Mice" as the Stooges' official theme song (the song also appeared somewhat prematurely in 1938's Flat Foot Stooges, due to some confusion in that film's release date). This version of "Three Blind Mice," often known as the "sliding strings" version, would be used regularly up to and including 1942's What's the Matador?. An alternate version of the 'sliding strings' version would be used for a brief period starting with 1945's If a Body Meets a Body.

We Want Our Mummy marks the final appearance of co-star James C. Morton, who died later on October 24, 1942.

The reference to the 1938 World Series between the New York Yankees and Chicago Cubs is a rare acknowledgement of a real-life sporting event.

References

External links 
 
 

1939 films
The Three Stooges films
American black-and-white films
1939 comedy films
1930s English-language films
American comedy thriller films
American mystery films
Films directed by Del Lord
Columbia Pictures short films
1930s mystery films
American comedy short films
1939 short films
1930s American films